Death (distinguished as Mistress Death or Lady Death) is a character appearing in American comic books published by Marvel Comics. Created by Mike Friedrich and Jim Starlin, the character first appeared in Captain Marvel #26 (June 1973). Death is a cosmic entity based on the personification of death.

Publication history

The entity appears in the title War Is Hell and forces soldier John Kowalski to undergo a number of lives and deaths as punishment for doing nothing to prevent the invasion of Poland, with Kowalski eventually becoming an aspect of Death; in the title Ghost Rider posing as "Death Ryder" to test Johnny Blaze and becoming fascinated with the Titan Thanos, and the mercenary Deadpool.

Fictional character biography

Death is an abstract entity, embodiment of life ending in the Marvel Universe, and the opposite of Eternity, embodiment of the universe. Death is predominantly depicted as a skeleton cloaked in a black or purple robe, and at times appears as a Caucasian human female.

A storyline in the title Captain Marvel showcases Thanos' scheme to conquer the universe, as the character becomes determined to prove his love for Death by destroying all life. Although Thanos obtains the artifact the Cosmic Cube and succeeds in taking control of the universe, Death abandons the character when he is defeated by the combined might of Captain Marvel, Drax the Destroyer and the Avengers. Two Marvel Annuals feature Thanos as he tries to "woo" Death back (courtesy of the Infinity Gems with which he plans to extinguish every star in the galaxy), but is killed in a final battle with the Avengers, Captain Marvel and Adam Warlock. When Captain Marvel is dying from cancer, Thanos returns to the character in a vision and introduces him to the entity Death. Marvel willingly surrenders his life and embraces the entity.

In Marvel's first limited series Contest of Champions, Death agrees to a game of strategy with the Elder of the Universe the Grandmaster. The Grandmaster wins the game and Death provides him with the power (via the Golden Globe of Life) to resurrect the Collector, a fellow Elder. Only then does Death reveal that the Golden Globe is an empty instrument that needs to be powered by a life-force equal to that of the being who is to be restored. To resurrect the Collector, the Grandmaster sacrifices his life and takes the Collector's place in the Realm of the Dead. In the limited series Secret Wars II the entity Beyonder takes human form and visits Earth. It decides to "save" mankind, and in doing so destroys Death. The Beyonder is then shown there is a need for Death and transforms his friend, a human reporter named Dave, into Death's new personification.

In an Avengers Annual, the Grandmaster reveals his sacrifice was a ruse as he's able to steal Death's powers and via another deception tricks the entity into banishing all Elders from the Realm of the Dead, effectively rendering them immortal. The threads of this storyline continue in the title Silver Surfer where a group of 11 Elders conspires to use the Infinity Gems to kill the cosmic entity Galactus and thereby destroy reality itself. After their plan is thwarted, Galactus devours 5 Elders, assuming that his status as a being who transcends Death and Eternity means that he does not have to abide by Death's vow. However, Galactus finds the Elders difficult to absorb and Death is displeased that Galactus has chosen to ignore her vow. Subsequently, when 3 Elders – the Astronomer; Possessor, and Trader – threaten to use the Infinity Gems to prevent the In-Betweener from hurling Galactus (with their brother Elders still inside him) into a black hole, the conceptual being responds by summoning Death and forcing her to negate the 3 Elders against her will, a transgression that Death finds heinous.

The limited series The Thanos Quest, reveals that Death perceives an imbalance in the universe and a gradual shift towards life rather than death; the entity resurrects Thanos. Thanos successfully collects the Infinity Gems, and attempts to converse with Death on its own level. The irony is the character is now superior to Death, and as such Death may not speak with him (a fact relayed via one of Death's minions). The story continues in a consecutive limited series The Infinity Gauntlet, in which Thanos then wipes half the beings in the universe from existence as proof of his love for Death; the entity remains and watches as he battles Earth's metahumans, but after they are defeated, Death joins the cosmic pantheon in trying to defeat Thanos. Though the cosmic entities are unsuccessful, Thanos eventually loses the Infinity Gems and is defeated.

The mercenary Deadpool is depicted having a humorous exchange with the entity in a Deadpool Annual. He becomes infatuated with Death after having a number of near-death experiences. During the Funeral for a Freak storyline, Death appears to reciprocate the feeling, and a jealous Thanos prevents Deadpool from dying and joining the entity by cursing him with immortality. In the second volume of Captain Marvel, Death reunites with Thanos to confront the Death God Walker, who tries unsuccessfully to court Death. Death hides within the body of Marlo Chandler (girlfriend of Rick Jones) in an attempt to escape Walker. The entity eventually destroys Walker and then leaves the body of Marlo, although Marlo retains a connection to Death which (in extreme circumstances) allows her to access the cosmic powers of Death.

The limited series Avengers: Celestial Quest continues to explore the relationship between Death and Thanos. As the entity reveals to Thanos that their energies merged when he was resurrected, creating an offspring called the Rot. Death and Thanos work together to destroy their offspring, and it is at this time that Death finally addresses Thanos and admits to feeling "love" for him. The pair also share a kiss in the limited series Marvel: The End, moments before Thanos, possessing the artifact the Heart of the Universe, recreates the universe minus a critical flaw that would have destroyed it.

During the limited series Annihilation, Thanos joins the fight to stop the Annihilation Wave, and during the war is killed by his old foe Drax the Destroyer. When the hero Nova is near death from injuries sustained in battle, he glimpses Death and Thanos standing together watching him. The second volume of the Guardians of the Galaxy features a new development: Phyla-Vell, the heroine Quasar, agrees to become the new avatar of Oblivion (an aspect of Death) in exchange for the freedom of lover Heather Douglas.

In The Thanos Imperative, the Captain Marvel of the Cancerverse, called Lord Mar-Vell, using a ritual to the Many-angled ones that involves sacrificing the Avatar of Death, is able to destroy Death's M-body and remove her from his universe. In the last issue of this 6-part mini-series, it is revealed that Thanos, upon coming back to life, has been completely removed from the realm of death and can no longer die. In a twist he appears to accept Lord Mar-Vell's proposal to be a sacrifice so the Many-angled ones can invade the 616 universe; however, this proves a trap set by Death herself in order to get close to Mar-Vell. By destroying him, she kills every living thing in the Cancerverse, initiates its and the Fault's collapse, and even injures the Many-angled ones to such a degree that it will take them eons to heal.

During the Chaos War storyline, Daimon Hellstrom mentions to Hercules that Death has fled their reality upon Amatsu-Mikaboshi triumphing in the realms of the dead, causing the souls of the deceased to be unleashed upon the Earth, and rendering the victims of the siege, whose injuries might otherwise prove fatal, merely locked in a deathless limbo.

Following the Dead No More: The Clone Conspiracy storyline, Death has appeared in Las Vegas under the guise of Marlo Chandler to talk with Ben Reilly -the clone of Spider-Man, recently brought back to life and spending some time acting as the new Jackal- initially instructing him to go after a duo of teen punks randomly shooting civilians around the city, claiming that she is testing what he will do about this discovery. Ben manages to find the criminals, shooting one of them twice with his own gun but avoiding causing fatal injuries, but when he is attacked by his "brother" and fellow clone Kaine after the death of a girl Reilly had been trying to treat for a serious illness, Marlo appears and kills Kaine with a single touch. "Marlo" subsequently identifies herself as Death and explains that she has an "interest" in Reilly as no other person has been brought back to life so often. She reveals that he has "died" so many times that his soul has become corrupted and if he undergoes one more resurrection, he will likely suffer so much spiritual damage that his soul will be broken for good. She offers Reilly the chance to restore Cassandra Mercury's daughter Abigail or Kaine to life before she departs. When Reilly asks her to save both of them and kill him instead, Death not only heals the other two, but also restores Reilly to a healthy physical appearance. Death also affirms that he has made a start on his efforts to redeem himself of his sins as the Jackal and to become a hero again. However, after Ben Reilly brutally beats a civilian who was responsible for the theft of food donations to a charity drive, Death reveals that the healing of his scars only remains so long as Reilly does not compromise his status as a hero, with the aforementioned beating leading to him regaining scars around his right eye.

Powers and abilities
As the embodiment of death, Death is an immortal and powerful cosmic abstract entity, which has no real physical body. The character possesses nigh infinite knowledge and power, being able to manipulate time and reality. The character has complete control over death and can therefore kill or resurrect individuals. Death occasionally appears as a humanoid female so as to be able to be perceived by lesser beings, and resides inside a pocket dimension known as the Realm of Death.

Reception

Critical reception 
Marco Vito Oddo of Collider referred to Death as a "fan-favorite cosmic entity," saying, "Death was born alongside the universe and is the embodiment of destruction. While that might sound ominous, destruction is needed to maintain balance, making Lady Death one of the fundamental forces keeping the universe together." David Harth of CBR.com called Death one of the "bravest gods in Marvel Comics", writing, "Death is one of the most powerful forces in the Marvel Universe. She rarely speaks, approaching those she deigns to appear to with the silence of the grave. She is, in a strange way, the definition of bravery. She has no fear at all because in a real way she is fear. Her power and the role she plays in the universe is as the thing most feared, which puts her above fear." Kayleigh Donaldson of Syfy said, "It’s no wonder that modern pop culture has enjoyed fleshing out its grim heroes beyond their skeletal foundations. [..] In Marvel Comics, Lady Death's power is so alluring, and the woman herself so hypnotically sexy, that Thanos tries to destroy half of all living beings in the universe just to impress her." 

Nat Brehmer of Screen Rant wrote, "Many fans were expecting, or at least hoping, to see Death in Infinity War because of her ties to Thanos. However, that obviously didn’t happen. In the comics, Thanos was in love with Death to the point that he would eliminate half the cosmos just to please her, and when that didn’t impress her, he made a female version of himself to be his companion just to make Lady Death jealous. This really couldn’t have been directly adapted to film. At the end of the day, Death is the living embodiment of unshakable mortality and too powerful to really have a part to play within the MCU." Marc Buxton of Den of Geek asserted, "Where there is Thanos, there is Death. Thanos’ beloved, the hooded embodiment of the end, should make an appearance before the Thanos saga is over. Something about that cloaked figure and her skull visage standing next to Thanos is so iconic. Death’s inclusion would make audiences understand (and fear) Thanos as he tries to burn a galaxy to win her love."

Accolades 
 In 2017, WhatCulture ranked Death 9th in their "10 New MCU Characters To Look Out For In 2018 " list.
 In 2017, Den of Geek ranked Death 12th in their "Guardians of the Galaxy 3: 50 Marvel Characters We Want to See" list.
 In 2018, Screen Rant ranked Death 19th in their "Marvel Vs DC: The 25 Most Powerful Gods" list.
 In 2019, CBR.com ranked Death and Thanos 1st in their "10 Most Evil Supervillain Couples In Marvel" list.
 In 2020, Scary Mommy included Death in their "Looking For A Role Model? These 195+ Marvel Female Characters Are Truly Heroic" list.
 In 2020, CBR.com ranked Death 3rd in their "19 Most Powerful Cosmic Marvel Characters" list.
 In 2021, Bustle ranked Death 8th in their "37 Most Powerful Characters In The Marvel Universe" list.
 In 2021, Looper ranked Death 7th in their "Strongest Supervillains In History" list.
 In 2021, CBR.com ranked Death 1st in their "Marvel: The 10 Strongest Female Gods" list, 8th in their "10 Smartest Gods In Marvel Comics" list, and 10th in their "10 Bravest Gods In Marvel Comics" list.
 In 2022, Collider ranked Death 4th in their "19 Most Powerful Marvel Characters" list.
 In 2022, Bustle ranked Death 3rd in their "Most Compelling Marvel Female Villains" list.
 In 2022, CBR.com ranked Death 1st in their "Marvel: The 10 Strongest Female Villains" list.
 In 2022, Screen Rant included Death in their "Eternity And 9 Other Crucial Cosmic Entities In Marvel Comics" list.

Other versions

Earth X
In the series Earth X, Death used the secret that Thanos' mother was a Skrull to trick him into believing she is his mother. When the deception is revealed, Thanos uses the Ultimate Nullifier to destroy Death.

In other media

Television

 The character was featured in Silver Surfer, voiced by Lally Cadeau. Due to Fox's broadcast standards, this version was depicted as a female personification of chaos known as Lady Chaos. Thanos would talk to a statue of Lady Chaos.

Film 
Death appeared in live-action films set in the Marvel Cinematic Universe in varying forms.

 The entity's likeness is depicted in Guardians of the Galaxy, within temple murals dedicated to it and others like it.
 A statue of Lady Death appears in Thor: Love and Thunder.

Video games
 Death is featured in the Deadpool video game, voiced by April Stewart. This version sports a reimagined appearance and is shown to be one of Deadpool's many romantic interests, a reference to the 1998 comic.
 Death has a non-playable appearance in Marvel vs. Capcom: Infinite, voiced by Alicyn Packard. This iteration allies with Jedah Dohma to merge their respective worlds, conscripting Thanos to aid the two. Thanos later seeks vengeance against Death for her betrayal.

See also
 Hela (comics)
 Death (personification) (Four Horsemen of the Apocalypse)
 Azrael (Angel of Death)
 Death (DC Comics)
 Death (Discworld)
 Death (Tarot card)

References

External links
 Death at Marvel.com
 Death at Marvel Directory
 

Characters created by Jim Starlin
Characters created by Mike Friedrich
Comics characters introduced in 1973
Fictional characters who can manipulate reality
Fictional characters with dimensional travel abilities
Fictional personifications of death
Marvel Comics abstract concepts
Marvel Comics female characters